The 2010–11 daytime network television schedule for four of the five major English-language commercial broadcast networks in the United States covers the weekday daytime hours from September 2010 to August 2011. The schedule is followed by a list per network of returning series, and any series canceled after the 2009–2010 season.

Affiliates fill time periods not occupied by network programs with local or syndicated programming. PBS – which offers daytime programming through a children's program block, PBS Kids – is not included, as its member television stations have local flexibility over most of their schedules and broadcast times for network shows may vary. Also not included are stations affiliated with Fox (as the network does not air a daytime network schedule or network news), MyNetworkTV (as the programming service also does not offer daytime programs of any kind), and Ion Television (as its schedule is composed mainly of syndicated reruns).

Legend

 New series are highlighted in bold.

Schedule
 All times correspond to U.S. Eastern and Pacific Time scheduling (except for some live sports or events). Except where affiliates slot certain programs outside their network-dictated timeslots, subtract one hour for Central, Mountain, Alaska, and Hawaii-Aleutian times.
 Local schedules may differ, as affiliates have the option to pre-empt or delay network programs. Such scheduling may be limited to preemptions caused by local or national breaking news or weather coverage (which may force stations to tape delay certain programs in overnight timeslots or defer them to a co-operated station or digital subchannel in their regular timeslot) and any major sports events scheduled to air in a weekday timeslot (mainly during major holidays). Stations may air shows at other times at their preference.

Monday-Friday

{| class=wikitable
! width="1.5%" bgcolor="#C0C0C0" colspan="2"|Network
! width="4%" bgcolor="#C0C0C0"|7:00 am
! width="4%" bgcolor="#C0C0C0"|7:30 am
! width="4%" bgcolor="#C0C0C0"|8:00 am
! width="4%" bgcolor="#C0C0C0"|8:30 am
! width="4%" bgcolor="#C0C0C0"|9:00 am
! width="4%" bgcolor="#C0C0C0"|9:30 am
! width="4%" bgcolor="#C0C0C0"|10:00 am
! width="4%" bgcolor="#C0C0C0"|10:30 am
! width="4%" bgcolor="#C0C0C0"|11:00 am
! width="4%" bgcolor="#C0C0C0"|11:30 am
! width="4%" bgcolor="#C0C0C0"|noon
! width="4%" bgcolor="#C0C0C0"|12:30 pm
! width="4%" bgcolor="#C0C0C0"|1:00 pm
! width="4%" bgcolor="#C0C0C0"|1:30 pm
! width="4%" bgcolor="#C0C0C0"|2:00 pm
! width="4%" bgcolor="#C0C0C0"|2:30 pm
! width="4%" bgcolor="#C0C0C0"|3:00 pm
! width="4%" bgcolor="#C0C0C0"|3:30 pm
! width="4%" bgcolor="#C0C0C0"|4:00 pm
! width="4%" bgcolor="#C0C0C0"|4:30 pm
! width="4%" bgcolor="#C0C0C0"|5:00 pm
! width="4%" bgcolor="#C0C0C0"|5:30 pm
! width="4%" bgcolor="#C0C0C0"|6:00 pm
! width="4%" bgcolor="#C0C0C0"|6:30 pm
|-
! bgcolor="#C0C0C0" colspan="2"|ABC
| bgcolor="gold" colspan="4"|Good Morning America
| bgcolor="white" colspan="4"|Local and/orsyndicated programming
| bgcolor="yellow" colspan="2"|The View
| bgcolor="white" colspan="2"|Local and/orsyndicated programming
| bgcolor="chartreuse" colspan="2"|All My Children
| bgcolor="chartreuse" colspan="2"|One Life to Live
| bgcolor="chartreuse" colspan="2"|General Hospital
| bgcolor="white" colspan="5"|Local and/orsyndicated programming
| bgcolor="gold"|ABC World News with Diane Sawyer
|- 
! bgcolor="#C0C0C0" rowspan="2"|CBS
! Fall
| bgcolor="gold" colspan="4" rowspan="2"|The Early Show
| bgcolor="white" colspan="2" rowspan="2"|Local and/orsyndicated programming
| bgcolor="pink" colspan="2" rowspan="2"|Let's Make a Deal
| bgcolor="pink" colspan="2" rowspan="2"|The Price Is Right
| bgcolor="white" rowspan="2"|Local and/orsyndicated programming
| bgcolor="chartreuse" colspan="2" rowspan="2"|The Young and the Restless
| bgcolor="chartreuse" rowspan="2"|The Bold and the Beautiful
| bgcolor="yellow" colspan="2" rowspan="2"|The Talk¤| bgcolor="white" colspan="7" rowspan="2"|Local and/orsyndicated programming
| bgcolor="gold" rowspan=1|CBS Evening News with Katie Couric|-
! Summer
| bgcolor="gold"|CBS Evening News with Scott Pelley|-
! bgcolor="#C0C0C0" colspan="2"|NBC
| bgcolor="gold" colspan="8"|Today| bgcolor="white" colspan="4"|Local and/orsyndicated programming
| bgcolor="chartreuse" colspan="2"|Days of Our Lives| bgcolor="white" colspan="9"|Local and/orsyndicated programming
| bgcolor="gold"|NBC Nightly News with Brian Williams|-
! bgcolor="#C0C0C0" colspan="2"|CW
| bgcolor="white" colspan="16"|Local and/orsyndicated programming
| bgcolor="lightgray" colspan="2"|The Tyra Banks Show 
| bgcolor="lightgray" colspan="2"|The Tyra Banks Show 
| bgcolor="white" colspan="4"|Local and/orsyndicated programming
|}

Notes:
 (¤) As CBS was transitioning shows in the 2:00 p.m. ET timeslot at the time due to the cancellation of As the World Turns, The Price Is Right aired in that hour during the weeks of September 20 and October 4 and Let's Make a Deal filled the slot during the weeks of September 27 and October 11, prior to the premiere of The Talk. Both game shows ran first-run episodes for both time slots.
 (‡) On September 19, 2011, The CW returned the 4:00 p.m. hour to its owned-and-operated stations and affiliates.

Saturday

Sunday

By network
ABC

Returning series:ABC KidsThe Emperor's New School Hannah Montana The Replacements The Suite Life of Zack and Cody That's So Raven ABC World News with Diane SawyerAll My ChildrenGeneral HospitalGood Morning AmericaOne Life to LiveThis Week with Christiane AmanpourThe ViewNot returning from 2009–10:ABC KidsMighty Morphin Power Rangers Power Rangers RPMCBS

Returning series:The Bold and the BeautifulCBS Sunday MorningCBS Evening News with Katie CouricCBS SportsNFL on CBS
SEC on CBSThe NFL TodayCookie Jar TVBusytown MysteriesHorseland Sabrina: The Animated Series Sabrina's Secret Life Doodlebops Rockin' Road ShowTrollz The Early ShowFace the NationLet's Make a DealThe Price Is RightThe Young and the RestlessNew series:The TalkNot returning from 2009–10:As the World Turns
Cookie Jar TV
Noonbory and the Super Seven
Strawberry Shortcake

FoxReturning series: Fox News Sunday
 Fox Sports
 Fox NFL
 Fox NFL Sunday
 This Week In Baseball
 Weekend Marketplace

NBCReturning series:Days of Our Lives
Meet the Press
NBC Nightly News with Brian Williams
Qubo (shared with Ion Television)
Babar 
Shelldon
The Magic School Bus  (moved from Fox Kids)
Turbo Dogs
Willa's Wild Life
Today
Today with Hoda and Kathie LeeNew series:Qubo (shared with Ion Television)PearlieNot returning from 2009–10:Qubo (shared with Ion Television)
3-2-1 Penguins!
Jacob Two-Two
Jane and the Dragon 
My Friend Rabbit 
The Zula Patrol

The CWReturning series:Toonzai
Cubix: Robots for Everyone 
Dinosaur King 
Dragon Ball Z Kai
Magi-Nation 
Sonic X 
Yu-Gi-Oh! 
Yu-Gi-Oh! 5Ds
The Tyra Banks Show Not returning from 2009–10:'ToonzaiChaotic: Secrets of the Lost CityHuntik: Secrets & Seekers RollBotsTMNT: Back to the SewerKamen Rider: Dragon KnightRenewals and cancellations
Cancellations/series endings
ABCAll My Children—Canceled after 41 years on April 14, 2011; the series concluded its ABC run on September 23, 2011.One Life to Live''—Canceled after 43 years on April 14, 2011; the series concluded its ABC run on January 13, 2012.

See also
2010–11 United States network television schedule (prime-time)
2010–11 United States network television schedule (late night)

References

Sources
 
 
 

United States weekday network television schedules
2010 in American television
2011 in American television